This is an incomplete list of Maccabiah medalists in football from 1932 to 2005.

Men

<small>1. Maccabi Modi'im was a delegation composed of Jewish athletes who couldn't compete under their nation flag, including USSR, Ethiopia, South Africa and Lebanon.

References

 

Maccabiah
Football
Association football player non-biographical articles